Pitfodels railway station or Pitfodels Halt was opened on 2 July 1894 by the GNoSR and served a suburb of Aberdeen with housing and estates such as Wellwood, Inchgarth and Norwood. The halt was one of several victims of the 1937 closure of stations on the Aberdeen suburban service. The Deeside Railway itself ran from Aberdeen (Joint) to Ballater. Pitfodels is located in the parish of Peterculter, Aberdeenshire, Scotland.

History 
The station was opened in August 1894 as part of a new Aberdeen suburban service on a section of the Deeside branch. At first the branch services had been operated by the Deeside Railway. The line became part of the GNoSR who opened Pitfodels and at grouping merged with the London and North Eastern Railway. Pitfodels became an unstaffed halt in 1926 due to low passenger usage. and was closed to passengers on 5 April 1937 as a part of the withdrawal of the Aberdeen suburban service that had been the victim of increasing competition from bus services. After its closure in 1937 the line itself remained open to Ballater until 1966. Cults and Ruthrieston stations were only a short distance away. The line has been lifted and this sections forms part of the Deeside Way long-distance footpath.

Infrastructure
The typical 1894 GNoSR design wooden station with a 'hipped' roof had a booking office, general waiting hall, staff accommodation and toilets. The main building stood on the eastbound platform on a section of track doubled at the time of its opening. A simple wooden shelter stood on the westbound platform with a pedestrian overbridge connecting the two. No goods yard, sidings or crossover points were present. Signals are marked however no signalbox is indicated on OS maps. A road overbridge stood at the eastern end of the station. By 1951 the line had been singled with the westbound track lifted.

Services
In 1928 the suburban railway service, with stations at Holburn Street, Ruthrieston, Pitfodels, Cults, West Cults, Murtle, Milltimber and Culter, locally called the 'subbies' started additionally operating Sunday, services however due to competition with the buses it was announced on 28 January 1937 that the service would cease altogether in April 1937, Sunday services having ceased in 1936. It had once been very popular, the journey taking around twenty minutes to go the seven or so miles. The 1894 service of eight trains had doubled in 1900. Suburban stations were only able to issue passengers tickets to stations served by the suburban train service.

The site today 
The enlarged and refurbished main station building survives, as does the stationmaster's cottage and both overgrown platforms remain with the trackbed in use as part of the Deeside Way. The Royal Deeside Railway is located at Milton of Crathes some distance down the line towards Ballater.

References

Sources
 
 Maxtone, Graham and Cooper, Mike (2018). Then and Now on the Great North. V.1. GNoSR Association. .

External links
Film of the station and the Deeside line.

Disused railway stations in Aberdeenshire
Former Great North of Scotland Railway stations
Railway stations in Great Britain opened in 1894
Railway stations in Great Britain closed in 1937